Echomimetic is an adjective that is best explained in English by the term "onomatopoeic", which is derived from "onomatopoeia", which is used in philology and literature and in the explanation of the origin of words in dictionaries.

In modern Greek lexicography, the term "onomatopoeia" is virtually non-existent and the words of which the etymology it describes are almost always designated as echomimetic. However, the "echo" of echomimetic is different from the "echo" of echolalia, which comes from Greek ἠχώ, which is the source for the modern English word echo, the two words being synonymous; while the "echo" of echomimetic comes from Greek ἦχος which means "sound".

"Mimetic" comes from Greek μιμητικός, meaning "imitating". In German philology the term lautmalend is used instead of echomimetic or onomatopoeic. It derives from German Laut ("sound") and malen ("to paint", as in art). The word Echomimie in German designates a psychiatric phenomenon akin to echolalia where gestures and grimaces substitute for the voice. In French, the word onomatopée is used for onomatopoeia. Examples of echomimetic words in English are "bow wow", "miaow", "squeak" and "squeal".

References

Animal communication